The pretty shiner (Lythrurus bellus) is a freshwater ray-finned fish in the family Cyprinidae, the carps and minnows. It occurs in the Mobile Bay drainage, and the Tennessee River drainage of the Bear and Yellow Creek systems in Alabama and Mississippi. Its preferred habitat is sandy and clay bottomed pools and runs of headwaters, creeks and small rivers.

References

Lythrurus
Freshwater fish of the United States
Fish described in 1881